Pala Catering Management Co Ltd, doing business as Pala Hamburger, is a Chinese fast food chain headquartered in the Wuhan CBD (武汉中央商务区).
The first store opened in Wuhan in 1999. Ke Zhaoyan, the marketing manager, stated that Pala opened in smaller cities and towns because its food is cheaper compared to that of Western-owned companies. In 2012 the company had about 1,000 franchised stores and about 400 direct sale stores. That year Pala planned to open an additional 460 stores. The number of stores grew to 1,700 in 2012, and in 2013 to 1,850. In 2014 China Daily ranked Pala as No. 6 of the " Top 10 fast-food chains in China".

References

External links
 Pala Hamburger 

Fast-food chains of China
Companies based in Wuhan
Restaurants established in 1999
Chinese companies established in 1999